Monsters is the sixth studio album by American rock band the Meat Puppets, released in October 1989. Their last release on SST Records, it was reissued on Rykodisc in 1999 with additional bonus tracks, recording notes by Derrick Bostrom and liner notes by music journalist Mark Kemp. As an added bonus, the reissue includes an "Enhanced CD" partition for play on home computers. Monsters offers the promotional video for "Light". The clip was produced and directed by Bill Taylor and features shots of the Puppets live in concert.

Background 
Derrick Bostrom stated in 1999 that the album originated with demos for major labels, but that the band decided to record Monsters with SST anyway because it took too long for majors to take notice. Kirkwood added that the album had been a response to acts like Bon Jovi and that with Monsters he wanted to show that the Meat Puppets could be a mainstream rock band.

Content

Musical style 
Monsters was described as a "heavy rock attack" by Stephen Thomas Erlewine in an AllMusic biography of the band, while Roaul Hernandez of Austin Chronicle remarked that the record was "metal all the way". Greg Prato stated that the Monsters was best described as a "cross" of the two preceding Meat Puppets albums, Huevos and Mirage.

Reception 

AllMusic'''s Greg Prato gave a mixed review of Monsters'', commenting that while songs were "hindered" by "synth textures" and individual instrument recording, the record had "several highlights" including a "vicious" album opener in "Attacked By Monsters", and the "tough rocker" "The Void".

Track listing
All songs written by Curt Kirkwood.

Personnel
Meat Puppets
Curt Kirkwood - guitar, vocals
Cris Kirkwood - bass, vocals
Derrick Bostrom - drums

References

1989 albums
Meat Puppets albums
SST Records albums